Sharifabad Rural District may refer to:

Sharifabad Rural District (Rafsanjan County), Kerman province
Sharifabad Rural District (Sirjan County), Kerman province
Sharifabad Rural District (Qazvin Province)
Sharifabad Rural District (Pakdasht County), Tehran province